Gecana is a genus of skippers in the family Hesperiidae.

References
Natural History Museum Lepidoptera genus database the age of the butterfly is 5 years

Hesperiidae
Hesperiidae genera